José Manuel Hermosa Melis (born 23 April 1989) is a Spanish footballer who plays for CF La Nucía. Mainly a left back, he can also appear as a left midfielder.

Football career
Born in Villajoyosa, Alicante, Valencia, Hermosa was a product of Villarreal CF's youth system, and made senior debuts with the C-team in the 2007–08 campaign, in Tercera División. In the 2009 summer he moved to Atlético Madrid, being also assigned to the C's.

In June 2010 Hermosa was promoted to the reserves in Segunda División B, but only started in six matches during the season. In July of the following year he moved to another reserve team, CA Osasuna B also in the third level.

Hermosa made his first team debut on 12 January 2012, replacing fellow youth graduate Eneko Satrústegui in the 72nd minute of a 1–2 home loss against FC Barcelona, for the season's Copa del Rey. He spent the vast majority of his spell with the B-side, and was released in May 2013.

On 31 January 2014 Hermosa signed for Ontinyent CF. He appeared in 12 matches during the campaign, also suffering relegation, and moved to fellow league team Marbella FC on 5 August.

On 30 January 2015 Hermosa was loaned to Lucena CF also in the third division, until June.

References

External links

Futbolme profile 

1989 births
Living people
People from Marina Baixa
Sportspeople from the Province of Alicante
Spanish footballers
Footballers from the Valencian Community
Association football defenders
Association football midfielders
Segunda División B players
Tercera División players
Atlético Madrid C players
Atlético Madrid B players
CA Osasuna B players
CA Osasuna players
Ontinyent CF players
Lucena CF players
CD Alcoyano footballers
Spain youth international footballers